Athoracophorus maculosus is a species of air-breathing land slug,  a terrestrial gastropod mollusc in the family Athoracophoridae, the "leaf-veined" slugs.

References

 Powell A. W. B., New Zealand Mollusca, William Collins Publishers Ltd, Auckland, New Zealand 1979 
 NZETC

Athoracophoridae
Gastropods of New Zealand
Gastropods described in 1963